"Have You Heard the Word" is a song attributed to The Fut. Written by Steve Kipner and Steve Groves, it is the band's only single. Most of the vocals were sung by Maurice Gibb, in the style of John Lennon. The B-side "Futting" was an instrumental. It was released as a single on 7 March 1970 but did not chart.

Recording and aftermath

"Have You Heard the Word" was recorded on 6 August 1969 at IBC Studios during a session for Groves and Kipner’s group Tin Tin. That day, Maurice Gibb had broken his arm falling down a flight of stairs. He showed up to the recording wearing a cast and under the effect of painkillers. Kipner and Groves were not happy with the song to begin with, and as the session deteriorated, they left. Maurice gave his vocals (an impression of John Lennon) to tape and played bass as well in his distinctive style despite his injuries. Lawrie recalls that he might have been there too, but admits his memory of the late 1960s is "none too good".

This song was credited to The Fut. Years later, Gibb said that he had no idea how that happened. The record appeared in early 1970, with rumours that it was one of The Beatles, perhaps a bootleg recording. The recording was so plausible as a Lennon song that Yoko Ono and Lenono Music, cleaning house in 1985, registered a copyright on it as a song written by John Lennon, even though Lennon had earlier denied participation. Later in May 1974, on RSO tapes, this song was credited as a Kipner/Groves composition, although BMI listed it as by Kipner, Groves and Lawrie.

Personnel
 Maurice Gibb —  lead vocals, bass
 Steve Groves —  lead vocals, guitar
 Steve Kipner —  lead vocals, piano
 Billy Lawrie —  background vocals
 Uncredited — drums

References

1969 songs
1970 debut singles
Songs written by Steve Kipner
Song recordings produced by Maurice Gibb